Recumbirostra is a clade of tetrapods which lived during the Carboniferous and Permian periods. They are thought to have had a fossorial (burrowing) lifestyle and the group includes both short-bodied and long-bodied snake-like forms. At least one species, the molgophid Nagini mazonense, lost its forelimbs entirely. It includes the families Pantylidae, Gymnarthridae, Ostodolepidae, Rhynchonkidae and Brachystelechidae, with additional families such as Microbrachidae and Molgophidae being included by some authors. Brachystelechidae and Molgophidae have also been grouped together in the suggested clade Chthonosauria.

Recumbirostra was erected as a clade in 2007 to include many of the taxa traditionally grouped in "Microsauria", which has since been shown to be a paraphyletic or polyphyletic grouping. Like other "microsaurs", the recumbirostrans have traditionally been considered to be members of the subclass Lepospondyli; however, many phylogenetic analyses conducted since the 2010s have recovered recumbirostrans as basal sauropsid amniotes instead. Not all phylogenetic analyses recognize Recumbirostra as a valid grouping. An alternative clade called Tuditanomorpha is occasionally supported and includes many of the same taxa.

Gallery

Phylogeny 
Below is a cladogram showing the phylogenetic relationships of recumbirostrans from Glienke (2012):

References

 
Pennsylvanian first appearances
Cisuralian extinctions